Odd Syversen (born 5 February 1945) is a Norwegian ice hockey player. He was born in Oslo, Norway and represented the club Vålerengens IF. He played for the Norwegian national ice hockey team, and  participated at the Winter Olympics in Grenoble in 1968.

References

External links

1945 births
Living people
Ice hockey players at the 1968 Winter Olympics
Norwegian ice hockey players
Olympic ice hockey players of Norway
Ice hockey people from Oslo